TVS Wego is a scooter manufactured by TVS Motor Company.  It is a unisex, dual usage scooter and was introduced in 2010. After releasing several variants of TVS Scooty, the company entered the higher-end segment of the scooterette market by introducing Wego.

TVS Wego has body balance technology. Body balance technology works on combining an ergonomic design with an engine placement that ensures an optimum center of gravity. This in turn improves maneuverability and stability, helping the user to handle varying road conditions.

Awards 
TVS Wego won the award for India’s Best Executive Scooter from J.D Power two years in a row in 2015 and 2016.

TVS Wego has won four Scooter of the Year awards in 2011: CNBC TV 18 Overdrive, Business Standard Motoring, NDTV Car and Bike, and Bike India. It is also the recipient of India Design Mark in 2014.

Product 
The TVS Wego is powered by a 109.7cc CVT-i high torque and a variometer transmission for providing power on demand. The company claims to deliver a 62 kmpl mileage. It has a low friction design, moly coat piston, and low friction engine oil.

For its male consumers, TVS Wego offers a large capacity engine, full metallic body for more sturdiness, and a spacious seat. For its female consumers, TVS Wego provides light and compact with easy to handle mechanicals and included storage space.

The scooter is designed to package 12 inch wheels, a low seat height for easy ground reach, external fuel fill, and under seat storage.

It is equipped with a fully digital instrument console that sports a trip meter and gives the rider service reminders, low fuel, and low battery indicators.

It has a telescopic suspension and gas filled rear shock absorbers for providing comfort to the rider. A patented easy center stand is geared at making it convenient for the user to put the bike up on center stand.

Other features include a dual side handle lock for ease in parking, a kick start mechanism that makes it possible to start the scooter while sitting, a luminous ignition key for better visibility, and tubeless tyres.

For enhanced safety and ease of operation, the company employs the Sync Braking Technology that features a system which integrates the rear brake and the front brake.  It also has Multi-refractor headlamps and a disc brake (as option).

The TVS Wego comes in 10 colors: Metallic orange, Metallic T-Grey, Volcanic Red, Deep Sky Blue, Midnight Black, Sporty White, Dual Tone : Orange + Black, Red+ Black, Blue + Black

Developments 
The company introduced a BS IV compliant version in 2017. The updated version was also fitted with a USB charging port, silver oak panels, and a dual toned seat. It was launched in two new colors: Metallic orange and T-grey.
TVS Wego has been discontinued in India, due to the high demand of another scooterette of TVS Motors I E  TVS Jupiter. Now TVS Wego is only supplied for overseas.

#WhyStopHere Blog 
The company runs a blog targeted at young urbanites that celebrating the spirit of the millennials that want to go above and beyond. It covers articles in the areas of Travel, Lifestyle, Culture, Hacks, and tips and tricks for the Wego.

References

External links
 

Motor scooters
TVS motorcycles
Motorcycles introduced in 2010
Indian motor scooters